The Council of the Hispanidad (Spanish: Consejo de la Hispanidad) was a public body of the Francoist dictatorship dependent of the Spanish Ministry of Foreign Affairs. Created in 1940, it aimed towards the realization of the idea of "Hispanidad". It lasted until 1945, when it was replaced by the Institute of Hispanic Culture (ICH).

History 
A law dated 2 November 1940, published in the Boletín Oficial del Estado on 7 November, gave birth to the organ. The text, that put Spain as the "spiritual axis of the hispanic world, with title of preeminency in regards to the universal concerns", made a passing mention in the articles to the possibility, unattainable in the short term, of a some kind of political union (Art. #2), a feature characteristic of the falangist ideary. Two months later, the composition of the Council was decided and, in April 1941, the bylaw of the organization was passed. These later regulations also attenuated  the imperialist whims present at the Law. The membership included public officials, military personnel, falangist leaders, religious figures and right-wing intellectuals, amounting for 74 councillors.

Until the creation of the Council of the Hispanidad, the issues related to Hispanic America were under the control of the Falange Exterior, organ of FET y de las JONS charged with the action of the party abroad. Later, the Service of the Falange Exterior maintained a pre-eminent role in the propaganda in Hispanic America.

Manuel Halcón was the Chancellor of the Council until his dismissal in July 1943. The vacant was not covered. His chancellery (a sort of executive board) was formed since April 1941 by Halcón, along Manuel Aznar, Fernando Castiella, Jesús Pabón, Antonio Tovar, Felipe Ximénez de Sandoval and Santiago Magariños.
The entity, in a progressive decline since the fall from grace of Ramón Serrano Suñer, was subject to a re-purposing proposal at the end of 1942, in order to overcome the criticism coming from the US, that labelled the council as pro-Fascist and anti-American. Its functions were replaced in December 1945, after the end of the World War II, by the newly created Institute of Hispanic Culture.

Notes

References

Bibliography 
 
 
 
 
 
 
 



 

Foreign relations of Spain during the Francoist dictatorship